Hexham is a market town and civil parish in Northumberland, England, on the south bank of the River Tyne, formed by the confluence of the North Tyne and the South Tyne at Warden nearby, and close to Hadrian's Wall. Hexham was the administrative centre for the Tynedale district from 1974 to 2009. In 2011, it had a population of 13,097.

Smaller towns and villages around Hexham include Corbridge, Riding Mill, Stocksfield and Wylam to the east, Acomb and Bellingham to the north, Allendale to the south and Haydon Bridge, Bardon Mill and Haltwhistle to the west.

History 
Hexham Abbey originated as a monastery founded by Wilfrid in 674. The crypt of the original monastery survives, and incorporates many stones taken from nearby Roman ruins, probably Corbridge or Hadrian's Wall. The current Hexham Abbey dates largely from the 11th century onward, but was significantly rebuilt in the 19th century. Other notable buildings in the town include the Moot Hall, the covered market, and the Old Gaol.

The Anglo-Saxon Chronicle (Manuscript D: Cotton Tiberius B IV) records the murder of King Ælfwald by Sicga at Scythlecester (which may be modern Chesters) on 23 September 788:
This year Alfwald, king of the Northumbrians, was slain by Siga, on the ninth day before the calends of October; and a heavenly light was often seen on the spot where he was slain. He was buried at Hexham in the church.
Her wæs Alfwald Norðhymbra cyning ofslægen fram Sigan on .viiii. Kalendas Octobris, 7 heofonlic leoht wæs lome gesewen þær þær he ofslægen wæs, 7 he wæs bebyrged on Hagustaldesee innan þære cyrican.
The name of Hexham derives from the Old English Hagustaldes ea and later Hagustaldes ham whence the modern form (with the "-ham" element) derives. Hagustald is related to the Old High German hagustalt, denoting a younger son who takes land outside the settlement; the element ea means "stream" or "river" and ham is the Old English form of the Modern English "home" (and the Scots and Northern English "hame").

Like many towns in the Anglo-Scottish border area and adjacent regions, Hexham suffered from the border wars between the kingdoms of Scotland and England, including attacks from William Wallace who burnt the town in 1297. In 1312, Robert the Bruce, King of Scotland, demanded and received £2000 from the town and monastery in order for them to be spared a similar fate. In 1346 the monastery was sacked in a later invasion led by King David II of Scotland.

In 1464 during the Wars of the Roses, the Battle of Hexham was fought somewhere to the south of the town; the actual site is disputed. The defeated Lancastrian commander, Henry Beaufort, 3rd Duke of Somerset, was executed in Hexham marketplace. There is a legend that Queen Margaret of Anjou took refuge after the battle in what is known as The Queen's Cave, where she was accosted by a robber; the legend formed the basis for an 18th-century play by George Colman the Younger (The Battle of Hexham); but it has been established that Queen Margaret had fled to France by the time the battle took place. The Queen's Cave in question is on the south side of the West Dipton Burn, to the southwest of Hexham.

Until 1572, Hexham was the administrative centre of the former Liberty or Peculiar of Hexhamshire.

In 1715, James Radclyffe, 3rd Earl of Derwentwater, raised the standard for James Francis Edward Stuart in Hexham Market place. The rising, however, was unsuccessful, and Derwentwater was captured and beheaded after the Battle of Preston.

Throughout the eighteenth and nineteenth centuries, Hexham was a centre of the leather trade, particularly renowned for making gloves known as Hexham Tans—now the name of a vegetarian restaurant in the town.

"Hexham" was used in the Borders as a euphemism for "Hell". Hence the term "To Hexham wi' you an' ye’r whussel!", recorded in 1873, and the popular expression "Gang to Hexham!". "Hexham-birnie" is derived from the term and means "an indefinitely remote place".

Hexham riot
In 1761, the Hexham Riot took place in the Market Place when a crowd protesting about changes in the criteria for serving in the militia were fired upon by troops from the North Yorkshire Militia. Fifty-one protesters were killed, earning the Militia the sobriquet of The Hexham Butchers.

Notable buildings 
Hexham's architectural landscape is dominated by Hexham Abbey. The current church largely dates from c. 1170–1250, in the Early English Gothic style of architecture. The choir, north and south transepts and the cloisters, where canons studied and meditated, date from this period. The east end was rebuilt in 1860.

The abbey stands at the west end of the market place, which is home to the Shambles, a Grade II* covered market built in 1766 by Sir Walter Blackett.

At the east end of the market place stands the Moot Hall, and a C15th gatehouse that was part of the defences of the town. The Moot Hall is a Grade I listed building, built c. AD 1400, and is considered one of the best examples of a medieval courthouse in the north of England. It was used as a courthouse until 1838. The Moot Hall now houses the Council offices of the Museums Department, though not open to the public any relevant enquiries can be made on the first floor. The ground floor is an art gallery open to hire.

The Old Gaol, behind the Moot Hall on Hallgates, was one of the first purpose-built jails in England. It was built between 1330 and 1333 and is a Grade I listed Scheduled Monument. It was ordered to be built by the Archbishop of York. The building is now home to the Old Gaol museum which informs the visitor about how the prisoners were kept at this time and how they were punished. There is also information concerning the local families of the time, such as the Charlton and Fenwick families who still have descendants living in the area. There are many different displays in the museum of interest to the whole family. The museum also contains the Border History Library, where people are free to visit to research their family history.

Hexham Library and the Queen's Hall Art Centre can both be found in the Queen's Hall. The building contains the Brough Local Studies Collection which is the second-largest local history collection in the county.

The Hencotes drill hall was completed in 1891.

The Leazes on Shaws Lane is a Grade II listed mansion built in 1853 by John Dobson for William Kinsopp.

Governance 
Hexham is in the parliamentary constituency of Hexham. Guy Opperman has been the member of parliament for Hexham since May 2010.
The town comes under Northumberland County Council and contains three wards: Hexham Central with Acomb, Hexham East and Hexham West.

Local media 

The Hexham Courant is the local newspaper, serving Hexham and Tynedale since 1864. It was first launched by J. Catherall & Co., and at that time espoused the Liberal cause. It later absorbed the Conservative-supporting Hexham Herald. In 1977, CN Group acquired the newspaper.

From within the Hexham Courant office a webcam over-looking Hexham Abbey can be viewed on the following website: Hexham Courant

BBC Radio Newcastle covers Hexham.

Horse racing from the town's course on Yarridge Heights is regularly featured on telecasts by Racing UK and other selected broadcasters. Regular sound broadcasts of cricket commentary for Tynedale CC can be heard via the internet during summer on Spreaker Internet Radio.

Education 
Hexham is served by state first, middle and high schools and uses the three-tier system as does the rest of Northumberland. Queen Elizabeth High School, partly located in a former hydropathic hotel, is the town's major educational centre.

Transport

Air 

Rail 
The town is served by Hexham, a station on the Tyne Valley Line. It is situated on part of the original Newcastle and Carlisle Railway route, dating back to 1837, and links the city of Newcastle upon Tyne with Carlisle. The line follows the course of the River Tyne through Northumberland.

Services on the Tyne Valley Line are currently operated by Northern Trains. As of the December 2019 timetable change, the station is served by a twice-hourly service heading west towards Carlisle, and three trains per hour heading east towards Newcastle.

Road 
This road serves as an alternative to the original route, the A695, which runs from Hexham to Newcastle upon Tyne, serving Corbridge, Stocksfield, Prudhoe and Blaydon.

Hexham Bus Station 

The original bus station was located at Priestpopple, dating back to the 1930s. In November 2016, the bus station was relocated to its current site at Dene Avenue – at a cost of £2.28 million.

Go North East provide most services in and around Hexham, with local services operating under the Tynedale Links brand. The AD122 tourist bus service operates year-round with increased services during the summer months, serving a number of locations along Hadrian's Wall, as well as the market town of Haltwhistle. Memorably, the route number, AD122, is the date of the building of the wall.

, the stand allocation is:

Awards 
Hexham won the town award in the 2005 Britain in Bloom awards. In the same year, it was also named England's Favourite Market Town by the magazine Country Life.

Hexham was voted the happiest place to live in Britain, 2019 and 2021.

Economy 

The major employer in Hexham is Egger (UK) Limited.

Hexham had been long famous for its manufacture of leather. Wright (1823) gives some statistics77 men & boys employed as Leather dressers and Glove-cutters, 40 boys employed as Dusters and 1,111 women employed as Sewers. Skins dressed annually were 80,000, and 18,000 skins of dressed leather were imported. From these were made and exported annually 23,504 dozens of pairs of gloves. Dutch Oker was used in the processing, but local fell clay could be used if necessary.Tanning was a necessary allied industry and there were four tanneries, employing a score of men. In a year they dealt with 5,000 hides and 12,000 calf skins. They supplied local saddlers, bootmakers and cobblers.
Hexham also had 16 master hatters, and the trade employed 40 persons. There were two woollen manufactories, worked by steam power, and two rope manufactories. There were corn water mills below the bridge. A windmill on the Sele was ruinous, but there was one still working on Tyne Green. It was, and still is a flourishing market, including a mart for cattle and other farm animals.

In Hexham the Subskimmer was designed and made by Submarine Products. The town is also the site of a chipboard factory owned by the Austrian firm Egger Retail Products GmbH, which vents steam which can be seen from miles away.

Botanical brewery Fentimans is based in Hexham.

Shopping 
Hexham has many shops commonly found in other English market-towns, with four central supermarkets (Tesco, Aldi, Marks and Spencer and Waitrose), multiple clothes shops, charity shops, banks, estate agents, antique shops and chemists. Cafes and coffee shops are also common in Hexham, from commercial chains (Costa) to family run independents.

Sport 
Hexham's racecourse is at Yarridge Heights in the hills above the town, with National Hunt (steeplechase) races throughout the year.

Tynedale Cricket Club

The town is also home to Tynedale Cricket Club, who play their home matches on Prior's Flat. (NE46 3EW)

Founded in 1888, the club has had its most successful period over the most recent 40 years when they dominated the Northumberland County League, before starting the 21st century by winning several championships in the newly created Northumberland & Tyneside Senior Cricket League.

In late 2017 Tynedale CC became a founder member of the new Northumberland & Tyneside Cricket League (NTCL), formed when a merger between NTSCL & Northumberland Cricket League was voted through by constituent clubs at the inaugural AGM held at Kingston Park Rugby Ground.

This new league will comprise six divisions with divisions 5 and 6 regionalised into north and south sections.

Hexham Rowing Club

Twin towns 
  Metzingen, Germany
  Noyon, France

People from Hexham

See also  
 Hexham Bridge
 Hexham Old Bridge
 Devil's Water
 Hexham (UK Parliament constituency)
 Ailred of Rievaulx
 Acca of Hexham
 Bishop of Hexham and Newcastle
 Eata of Hexham
 Richard of Hexham
 John of Hexham
 Roman Catholic Diocese of Hexham and Newcastle
 Battle of Heavenfield
 Battle of Neville's Cross
 Robbs
 Hexham Heads

References

External links 

 
Hexham visitor website

 
Market towns in Northumberland
Towns in Northumberland